The fifty-cent coin was first introduced as a .900 purity silver half dollar in 1866. These coins were 13.41 grams, with a diameter of 32 mm, thickness of 2 mm, and a reeded edge. The design was similar to the British trade dollar, except the image of Britannia was replaced by Queen Victoria. The dates of issue were 1866-67 with only 59,000 issued for both dates combined.

In 1890, a second issue of this coin was made, this time as a fifty-cent piece. The mintage years was from 1890–94 and 1902, 1904-05. The coin was reeded but reduced in size to 30.5 mm in diameter, but with an increase in weight to 13.48 grammes, but the thickness stayed the same at 2 mm. Metal composition was .800 silver.

No more of this denomination was minted until 1951 when a copper-nickel coin was issued. It was 23.5 mm in diameter, weighed 5.81 g and 2 mm in thickness. Until 1971, the reeding was with a security edge and from then onwards was just reeded. In 1977 a nickel-brass coin was issued which reduced the size of the coin. The bauhinia series, without the queen's portrait, was issued in 1993. In 1997 a commemorative coin was issued for the hand over of Hong Kong to China. It featured an ox.

Mintage years are as follows: 1951, 1958, 1960–61, 1963–68, 1970–75, 1977–80, 1990, 1993–95, 1997-98 and 2015.

Mintage

Mintmarks
 H = Heaton
 KN = King's Norton

References

 Ma Tak Wo 2004, Illustrated Catalogue of Hong Kong Currency, Ma Tak Wo Numismatic Co., LTD Kowloon Hong Kong. 

Coins of Hong Kong
Fifty-cent coins